Bernd Stieler (born 27 January 1960) is a former German footballer.

Stieler made 4 appearances in the 2. Fußball-Bundesliga for Tennis Borussia Berlin during his playing career.

References 
 

1960 births
Living people
German footballers
Association football goalkeepers
2. Bundesliga players
Tennis Borussia Berlin players
Hertha Zehlendorf players